Armstrong House, Armstrong Farm, or variations, may refer to:

Armstrong Kessler Mansion (Savannah, Georgia), Savannah, Georgia
A. Armstrong Farm,	Newark, Delaware
Armstrong-Walker House, Middletown, Delaware
Armstrong House (Citra, Florida)
Armstrong House (Lumpkin, Georgia)
George and Susan Guiberson Armstrong House, Winterset, Iowa
Robert and Esther Armstrong House, Cedar Rapids, Iowa
Armstrong House (North Adams, Massachusetts)
Joseph Armstrong House, Lapeer, Michigan
John M. Armstrong House, St. Paul, Minnesota
Armstrong-Lee House, Monticello, Mississippi, listed on the National Register of Historic Places
Foster–Armstrong House, Montague Township, New Jersey, listed on the NRHP in Sussex County
Louis Armstrong House, Queens, New York
Porter Houses and Armstrong Kitchen, Whitakers, North Carolina
Armstrong Farm (Crane Township, Wyandot County, Ohio), near Upper Sandusky, Ohio
Joseph Armstrong Farm, Fredericksburg, Ohio
Alfred J. and Georgia A. Armstrong House, Portland, Oregon
Tannler–Armstrong House, Portland, Oregon
Residencia Armstrong-Poventud, Ponce, Puerto Rico, also known as Armstrong-Toro House
Armstrong House-Allen Academy, Bryan, Texas, listed on the National Register of Historic Places
Armstrong-Adams House, Salado, Texas, listed on the National Register of Historic Places
Armstrong House (Ripley, West Virginia)
Francis Armstrong House, Salt Lake City, Utah